Luiz Pedro de Oliveira e Silva (26 February 1953 – 2 June 2021) was a Brazilian politician and journalist. He served in the Legislative Assembly of Maranhão from 1983 to 1987 and again from 2003 to 2007. He also served in the cabinet of Jackson Lago from 2007 to 2009.

Biography

1953 births
2021 deaths
Brazilian journalists
20th-century Brazilian politicians
21st-century Brazilian politicians
Members of the Legislative Assembly of Maranhão
Brazilian Democratic Movement politicians
Communist Party of Brazil politicians
Brazilian Socialist Party politicians
Democratic Labour Party (Brazil) politicians
People from Juazeiro do Norte